Otto Meitinger (8 May 1927 in Munich – 9 September 2017) was a German architect and preservationist. From 1987 to 1995 he was president of the Technical University Munich.

Life 
Meitinger was born as son of the first municipal architect of Munich Karl Meitinger. He studied architecture at the Department of Architecture of the Technical University Munich, finished his Staatsexamen and got his doctorate on the building history of the Munich Residenz.

From 1953 to 1963 he was Director of the Residenz Building Offices and in charge of the reconstruction of the Munich Residenz, including the Cuvilliés Theatre, court chappel, treasure chamber and Ornate Rooms (Reichen Zimmer). At that time the reconstruction of the Residenz was considered as example for the reconstruction of war-destroyed historical buildings all over Europe. From 1963 to 1976 he was head of the building department of the Max Planck Society and responsible for over 60 new institute buildings, domestic and abroad.

In 1976 he became Professor for Design and Preservation at the Technical University of Munich. In 1987 he was elected President of the University and stayed in office until his retirement in 1995. "He took the chance of generation change and won first class professors to secure the leading position of the TU in teaching and research."

Meitinger was member of a variety of professional societies and committees, i.e., at the German Academy of town planning (Deutschen Akademie für Städtebau), the Bavarian State Architectural Art Committee (Bayerischen Landesbaukunstausschuss), the State Memorial Committee (Landesdenkmalrat), the selection committees of the Bavarian State Foundation and the Hypo-Art-Foundation (Bayerischen Landesstiftung/Hypo-Kulturstiftung) and the board of trustees of the Philip Morris Foundation (Kuratorium der Philip Morris Stiftung).

Important work 

 Recreation of the Residenz, Munich
 Palazzo Zuccari, Rome
 Kaulbach-Villa, Munich
 Rebuilding of Hammerschmidt Villa, Bonn
 Rebuilding of Bellevue Palace, Berlin
 Marstallplatz, Munich

Honours and distinctions 
 Bavarian Maximilian Order for Science and Art (1991)
 Bavarian Order of Merit
 Commanders Cross of the Order of Merit of the Federal Republic of Germany (Großes Bundesverdienstkreuz)
 Medal Bene Merenti in Silver of the Bavarian Academy of Sciences and Humanities (1959)
 Commanders Cross of the Etoile noir of the French Legion of Honour
 Knight of the Order of St. Sylvester,
 Golden Honorary Coin of the City of Munich (1995) (Goldene Ehrenmünze der Stadt München).
 Honorary citizen of the city of Munich (2005)
 Founding Member of the European Academy of Sciences and Arts (1990)

Literature 
 Lehrstuhl für Entwerfen und Denkmalpflege TU München: Otto Meitinger : Architekt - Denkmalpfleger - Hochschullehrer München 1997

External links 
 
 "Professor Dr. Otto Meitinger neuer Münchner Ehrenbürger" (in German), Press notice, City of Munich, 2005.
 Professor Dr.-Ing. Otto Meitinger wird 80 (in German), Bayerische Ingenieurekammer-Bau, 2007.
 Otto Meitinger wird 80 (in German), Press Notice. TU Munich. 30 April 2007.

References 

1927 births
2017 deaths
20th-century German architects
Architects from Munich
Technical University of Munich alumni
Academic staff of the Technical University of Munich
Presidents of the Technical University of Munich
Commanders Crosses of the Order of Merit of the Federal Republic of Germany
Commandeurs of the Légion d'honneur
Knights of the Order of St. Sylvester
Members of the European Academy of Sciences and Arts